Monistrol may refer to several places:

In France:
 Monistrol-d'Allier, Haute-Loire
 Monistrol-sur-Loire, Haute-Loire

In Spain:
 Monistrol de Calders, Bages, Catalonia
 Monistrol de Montserrat, Bages, Catalonia